Calvin Richard Klein (born November 19, 1942) is an American fashion designer who launched the company that would later become Calvin Klein Inc., in 1968. In addition to clothing, he also has given his name to a range of perfumes, watches, and jewellery.

Early years 
Klein was born on November 19, 1942, to a Jewish family in the Bronx, New York City, the son of Flore (née Stern; 1909–2006) and Leo Klein. Leo had immigrated to New York from the village of Boiany (modern-day Chernivtsi Oblast, Ukraine), while Flore was born in the United States to immigrants from Galicia and Buchenland, Austria-Hungary (modern day-Ukraine).

Klein went to Isobel Rooney Middle School 80 (M.S.80) as a child. He attended the High School of Art and Design in Manhattan and matriculated at, but never graduated from, New York's Fashion Institute of Technology, instead receiving an honorary doctorate in 2003. He did his apprenticeship in 1962 at an old line cloak-and-suit manufacturer, Dan Millstein, and spent five years designing at other New York City shops. In 1968, he launched his first company with his childhood best friend, Barry K. Schwartz.

He became a protégé of Baron de Gunzburg, through whose introductions he became the toast of the New York elite fashion scene even before he had his first mainstream success with the launch of his first jeans line. He was immediately recognized for his talent after his first major showing at New York Fashion Week. He was hailed as the new Yves Saint Laurent, and was noted for his clean lines.

Personal life 
Klein married Jayne Centre, a textile designer, in 1964. They have a daughter, television producer Marci Klein, who is best known for her work on NBC's Saturday Night Live and 30 Rock. The couple divorced in 1974. In September 1986, Klein married his assistant Kelly Rector in Rome while they were on a buying trip in Italy. She later became a well-known socialite photographer.  After separating in 1996, they divorced in April 2006 after 20 years of marriage.

In 2003, Klein bought an ocean-front estate in Southampton, New York, on Long Island and demolished it to build a $75 million glass-and-concrete mansion. In 2015, he put his Miami Beach, Florida mansion on the market for $16 million. The Florida home sold in February 2017 for $12,850,000. In June 2015, Klein bought a mansion in Los Angeles, California, for $25 million.

Calvin Klein dated gay, ex-porn star Nicholas Gruber. Klein is a supporter of the U.S. Democratic Party, having given over $250,000 to candidates and PACs since 1980.

Awards 
In 1974, Klein designed the tight-fitting signature jeans that would go on to gross $200,000 in their first week of sales. In that same year he also became the first designer to receive outstanding design in men's and women's wear from the Council of Fashion Designers of America (CFDA) award show. In 1983, he was placed on the International Best Dressed List. Also in 1981, 1983, and 1993, he received an award from the CFDA. In 1991, he received the American Academy of Achievement's Golden Plate Award.

Other 
Klein made a cameo appearance in season 3, episode 15 ("The Bubble") of the television series 30 Rock. A fictionalized version of him also appears in season 4, episode 13 ("The Pick") of the television series Seinfeld.

Filmography 
 The Emperor's New Clothes: An All-Star Illustrated Retelling of the Classic Fairy Tale 1998 (voice)

See also 
 High culture
 Jews in New York City
 List of LGBT people from New York City

References

External links 

 Info and photos related to Calvin Klein at askmen.com
 Calvin Klein talks trends on VOGUE.COM
 Calvin Klein's bio at informat.com
 The Biography Channel
 Some History and Background on Calvin Klein
 Calvin Klein — a modern fashion icon
 People magazine, January 18,1982. Calvin Klein, King of clothes
 The Latest Calvin by Michael Gross, NY Magazine August 8, 1988

1942 births
Living people
American fashion businesspeople
American fashion designers
American people of Hungarian-Jewish descent
American people of Ukrainian-Jewish descent
Art Students League of New York alumni
Businesspeople from New York (state)
Fashion Institute of Technology alumni
Jewish fashion designers
LGBT fashion designers
American male voice actors
American LGBT businesspeople
American LGBT artists
American bisexual people
People from the Bronx
New York (state) Democrats
High School of Art and Design alumni
Bisexual men
Bisexual businesspeople
Bisexual Jews
American people of Jewish descent
20th-century American Jews
21st-century American Jews